

Winners of SEATTA Championships (1998 - Now)

Results of SEATTA Events
The tables below are  South East Asian Table Tennis Champions lists of events (Men's and Women's Singles, Men's, Women's, and Mixed Doubles, and Men's and Women's Team).

Men's singles

Women's singles

Men's doubles

Women's doubles

Mixed doubles

Men's team

Women's team

See also
Asian Table Tennis Union
Asian Table Tennis Championships
South East Asian Table Tennis Championships

References

ITTF Statistics
ATTU Website

List
South East Asian Table Tennis Championships
Lists of table tennis players
Lists of sports medalists